The list of shipwrecks before Anno Domini includes some ships sunk, wrecked or otherwise lost before the year AD 1 of the Gregorian calendar.

 1st century BC
 Mahdia – 80 BC.
 Antikythera wreck – 86 BC.

 2nd century BC
 Thonis shipwreck – late 2nd century BC. The warship was sunk by debris falling from a temple that collapsed during an earthquake.

 3rd century BC
 Marsala Punic ships, Sicily – 241 BC.

 4th century BC
 Found in the Mediterranean on the Eratosthenes Seamount, by the Ocean Exploration Trust's vessel EV Nautilus.
 Kyrenia ship – 4th century BC.
 Porticello wreck – 400 BC.
 A Greek merchant ship with rudder, rowing benches and the contents of the hold still intact was found in the Black Sea, off the coast of Bulgaria. – more than 2,400 years old.

 5th century BC
 Ma'agan Mikha'el shipwreck – 5th century BC.
 Tektas wreck, Turkey – 450-425 BC.

 6th century BC
 Giglio Island shipwreck – 600 BC.

 7th century BC
 Gozo Phoenician shipwreck off the coast of Malta.

10th to 20th century BC
 The Cape Gelidonya shipwreck – 1200 BC.
 The Uluburun shipwreck – 1300 BC.

 20th century BC and earlier
 Dokos shipwreck – 2700–2200 BC.

References

0
Shipwecks
Shipwrecks, -9999